Palaeomystella is a genus of moths in the family Agonoxenidae.

Species
Palaeomystella chalcopeda (Meyrick, 1931)
Palaeomystella fernandesi Becker & Moreira, 2014
Palaeomystella henriettiphila Becker & Adamski, 2008
Palaeomystella oligophaga Becker & Adamski, 2008
Palaeomystella rosaemariae Becker & Moreira, 2014
Palaeomystella tavaresi Becker & Moreira, 2014
Palaeomystella tibouchinae Becker & Adamski, 2008

References

 , 2008: Three new cecidogenous Palaeomystella Fletcher (Lepidoptera, Coleophoridae, Momphinae) associated with Melastomataceae in Brazil. Revista Brasileira de Entomologia 52 (4): 647-657. Full article: .

Agonoxeninae
Moth genera